Zeelandia, a community in the Essequibo Islands-West Demerara region of Guyana.

Zeelandia is one of many villages and plantations on Wakenaam, the most developed of the Essequibo River islands. The village is named after the sugar plantation Zeelandia.

Located at the extreme northern end of the island facing the Atlantic Ocean, Zeelandia is a fishing village. The area is subject to land degradation and flooding.

Zeelandia is also home to many agricultural farms, growing items such as rice, coconut, and various other fruits and vegetables.

References

Populated places in Essequibo Islands-West Demerara